The 2002–03 Michigan Wolverines men's basketball team represented the University of Michigan in intercollegiate college basketball during the 2002–03 season. The team played its home games in the Crisler Arena in Ann Arbor, Michigan, and was a member of the Big Ten Conference.  Under the direction of head coach Tommy Amaker, the team finished tied for third in the Big Ten Conference.  The team earned a third seed but was defeated in the first round of the 2003 Big Ten Conference men's basketball tournament.  The team did not participate in either the 2003 National Invitation Tournament or the 2003 NCAA Men's Division I Basketball Tournament because of the University of Michigan basketball scandal. The team was unranked for all eighteen weeks of Associated Press Top Twenty-Five Poll, and it also ended the season unranked in the final USA Today/CNN Poll.  The team had a 1–3 record against ranked opponents, with the lone victory coming against #24 Purdue 78–67 on February 19 at Mackey Arena.

Rotolu Adebiyi, LaVell Blanchard and Gavin Groninger served as team co-captains, and LaVell Blanchard and Daniel Horton shared team MVP  honors.  The team's leading scorers were LaVell Blanchard (485 points), Daniel Horton (457 points) and Bernard Robinson, Jr. (339 points).  The leading rebounders were Blanchard (205), Robinson (178) and Graham Brown (138).

LaVell Blanchard won the Big Ten Conference statistical championship with a 43.3% three-point field goal percentage in conference games.  The team as a whole also led the big ten in three-point field goal percentage (37.5%) in conference games.

In the 2003 Big Ten Conference men's basketball tournament at the United Center from March 13–16, Michigan was seeded third.  In the first round, they had a bye.  Then they lost in the second round to number 6 Indiana 63–56.

Team players drafted into the NBA

References

External links
stats @ ESPN

Michigan Wolverines men's basketball seasons
Michigan Wolverines
Michigan Wolverines men's b
Michigan Wolverines men's b